The New Family Structures Study (abbreviated NFSS) is a sociological study of LGBT parenting conducted by sociologist Mark Regnerus of the University of Texas at Austin. The study surveyed over 15,000 Americans of ages 18 to 39. The first research article based on data from the study was published in July 2012 in Social Science Research, and concluded that people who had had a parent who had been in a same-gender relationship were at a greater risk of several adverse outcomes, including "being on public assistance, being unemployed, and having poorer educational attainment."

The study was met with considerable criticism from many academics and scholarly organizations. Most notably, only two children in the study had actually lived with homosexually partnered parents for their entire childhoods. Many of the non-heterosexual parents were in previous heterosexual marriages, and had then gone on to be in a same-sex relationship at some point. Regnerus removed the effects of divorce, infidelity, single parenthood from his heterosexual control group, but not from the gay parent group. Thus, negative outcomes could be attributed to family disruption and divorce, as opposed to homosexual parenting. More importantly, large studies of twins separated at birth and raised in different environments found that they grew up to be just as similar as those raised together, and large adoption studies found that adopted children correlated with their biological parents for genetic reasons, not their adoptive parents. Thus, parents tend to have limited environmental effects on their children's behavior, and negative outcomes very likely correlate with shared genes between parents and children. A 2015 reanalysis raised serious questions about the validity of the study, suggesting misclassification of families, inconsistency in answers suggesting mischief, and evidence many respondents did not live with their non-heterosexual parents. When these cases were excluded the differences largely vanished.

Methodology
The NFSS survey of over 15,000 Americans between the ages of 18 and 39 was conducted by Knowledge Networks on behalf of the University of Texas at Austin. Its stated purpose was to determine differences in outcomes among young adults raised by same-sex parents compared to young adults raised by "their married biological parents, those raised with a step-parent, and those raised in homes with two adoptive parents." The survey collected data from young adults who had grown up in one of five unconventional families, namely, those where a parent had had a same-sex romantic relationship, biologically unrelated parents adopted the respondent, parents were unmarried but co-habiting, biological mother had a romantic relationship with another man, and biological mother did not have a romantic relationship with another man. The survey also collected data from young adults from conventional families as a control group.

Findings
The study compared various types of families, and found that subjects who perceived their parents as having engaged in a same-sex relationship were more likely to have been sexually abused by their parents. When compared with those who grew up in (still) intact, biological mother–father families, the subjects who reported that their mother had had a same-sex relationship and did not make a similar report about their father look different on outcomes regarding including education, depression, employment status, and marijuana use.

Regnerus states although the findings reported may be explicable in part by a variety of forces uniquely problematic for child development in lesbian and gay families—including a lack of social support for parents, stress exposure resulting from persistent stigma, and modest or absent legal security for their parental and romantic relationship statuses—the empirical claim that no notable differences exist must go.

The term LM is used for subjects who stated that their mother had had a same-sex romantic relationship but did not make a similar statement about their father. The term GF is used for subjects that stated that their father had had a same-sex romantic relationship. The term IBF is used for subjects whose biological families were intact from birth through the time of the survey.

Table 2
(The following results are mean scores on select dichotomous outcome variables.)

The results are read in the percentage of children from each family structure who responded positively to each question. For example, for the variable "currently married" 43% of respondents from intact bio-family answered yes, whereas 36% of those in the LM category answered yes, and 35% of those in the GF category answered yes.

Funding
The study was funded by the Witherspoon Institute, which spent about $700,000 on it, and by the Bradley Foundation, which invested $90,000 in it. The Witherspoon Institute's president expected results that would be unfavorable to those supporting gay marriage. In the initial report, Regnerus stated that the Witherspoon Institute and the Bradley Foundation played no role in the design of the study, and dismissed accusations that these organizations had improperly influenced him. In 2013, however, in response to requests by the American Independent News Network, emails sent between Regnerus and Witherspoon Institute employee Brad Wilcox were released which cast doubt on these statements. In one email, Wilcox approved several items relating to the study on behalf of the Witherspoon Institute. Critics have also noted that Wilcox was on the editorial board of Social Science Research, the journal in which the study was later published.

Controversy

Cynthia Osborne, who is on the UT-Austin faculty along with Regnerus, argued the study was unable to show "whether same-sex parenting causes the observed differences." She also said that "Children of lesbian mothers might have lived in many different family structures, and it is impossible to isolate the effects of living with a lesbian mother from experiencing divorce, remarriage or living with a single parent." Similarly, Gary Gates of the Williams Institute argued that the study's comparison of children of lesbian mothers was a less fair comparison than, for instance, comparing "children of heterosexual or same-sex couples who were raised in similar homes".

Regnerus's former mentor Christian Smith has described the public and academic reaction to the New Family Structures Study as a "witch hunt" and said that the "push-back" to Regnerus's article "is coming simply because some people don't like where the data led." This backlash, Smith argues in his book The Sacred Project of American Sociology, is a result of the content of sociology's "sacred project" (of mitigating oppression, inequality, etc.); Smith holds that the critical reaction, e.g. on methodological issues, displays a set of double standards insofar as work by other scholars could be (but is generally not) subjected to similar criticism.

Regnerus's study was defended by 18 social scientists in a letter written on the website of the Institute for Studies of Religion at Baylor University.

Allegations of scientific misconduct
Soon after the paper was published, gay blogger Scott Rose accused Regnerus of scientific misconduct for two reasons: deviating from ethical standards and possible falsification of his research. An inquiry later conducted by the University of Texas-Austin found that no investigation into these charges was warranted. In 2014, the Dean of the College of Liberal Arts at the University of Texas-Austin, Randy Diehl asked University of Texas sociologist and associate dean Marc Musick to review the controversy around the NFSS article as part of Regnerus's seventh-year post-tenure evaluation. Musick summarized many of the prior criticisms, then stated that the survey itself was designed to ensure the conflation of family structure and the parents' same-sex orientation, practically guaranteeing negative results. Musick stated that non-disclosure of this design flaw in the original article possibly violated University research ethics standards.

Peer review process
In July 2012, over 150 scientists wrote a letter to the editor of Social Science Research criticizing the study and raising concerns about the journal's peer review process. 

In the November 2012 issue of the journal, an audit was published by Darren Sherkat of Southern Illinois University regarding the peer-review process with respect to the Regnerus study (as well as another study from the same issue). The audit concluded that the peer-review process failed in these instances because of "both ideology and inattention" by the reviewers; he added that of the six reviewers, three of them were on record as opposing same-sex marriage. Sherkat also dismissed the study as "bullshit" in an interview and argued that its definition of gay fathers and lesbian mothers should have "disqualified it immediately" from being considered for publication.
 
In August 2013, sociologist Philip N. Cohen wrote on his blog that Wright relied on paid consultants to review the paper and failed to disclose this when the study was first published. He also called for the paper to be retracted and for Wright to step down.

Subsequent studies and reanalysis
Two subsequent studies published in Social Science Research  and Sociological Science claimed that when methodological flaws were removed from data used in Regnerus study, the conclusions were opposite. 

The first peer-reviewed and published criticism is the Cheng and Powell, 2015 review. The authors state that they identified a large number of potential measurement errors and other methodological choices which led to erroneous results. They state that even small differences in coding can profoundly shape empirical patterns, and that after repeating the analysis with sound methods, the "differences in being raised by gay/lesbian and heterosexual parents are minimal." 

The second such peer reviewed criticism is by Stanford University Sociology professor Michael J. Rosenfeld which also brings out the methodological flaws in Regnerus study. It was published in Sociological Science.

However Professor Walter Schumm Department of Family Studies, Kansas State University criticized the findings of Cheng and Powell, stating that they were statistically insignificant, as they did not report effect sizes. Because they reduced the number of same-sex parent families considerably, it is actually possible that the effect sizes were unchanged, but due to the smaller sample statistical significance was lost. He also criticized studies that show the opposite results as Regnerus for having very low sample sizes, being politically motivated themselves, and that these were poorly made refutations quickly thrown out as a knee jerk reaction because science came out with results that contradicted the modern liberal political theories, and did not follow the APA's own recommendations for reporting effect sizes and other methodological requirements.

Citations in court cases
The New Family Structures Study was cited in amicus briefs for the United States Supreme Court cases of United States v. Windsor and Hollingsworth v. Perry. It was also cited by U.S. District Court judge Alan Cooke Kay in Jackson v. Abercrombie, who used Regnerus's study to dismiss other studies that had come to different conclusions.

In the 2012 California case Golinski v. Office of Personnel Management, several major medical organizations, including the American Psychological Association, filed an amicus brief in which they criticized Regnerus's research. The brief argued that "the Regnerus study sheds no light on the parenting of stable, committed same-sex couples".

References

Sociology controversies
LGBT parenting
Epidemiological study projects
Academic journal articles
University of Texas at Austin